Nola pumila is a moth of the family Nolidae. It is found in the Indo-Australian tropics, including China (Shanghai), Formosa, Sikkim, Assam, India, Burma, Sulawesi and New Guinea.

The larvae feed on fruits of Shorea species and possibly the flowers of Dryobalanops species, although this might refer to a related species.

External links
The Moths of Borneo

pumila
Moths of Asia
Moths of Oceania
Lepidoptera of New Guinea
Insects of China
Insects of India
Moths described in 1875